Moussa Saïb (born 6 March 1969) is an Algerian football manager and former player. He is currently unattached, after last managing JS Kabylie in the Algerian Ligue Professionnelle 1.

Club career
Saïb started his football career with a club from the west of Algeria called (Jeunesse Sportive de Tiaret) then he moved to JSK and helped them to win the African Champions League in 1990. In 1992, he joined French club AJ Auxerre for an undisclosed fee. In May 1997, Arsenal coach Arsène Wenger tried to buy him along with Swiss center back Murat Yakın in what would have been a "sensational" £7 million deal; however the deal did not succeed and Saib instead joined Spanish club Valencia for £3 million. In 1998, he joined struggling English club Tottenham Hotspur for £2.3 million, thus becoming the first Algerian to play in the Premier League. He helped Tottenham avoid relegation by scoring the sixth goal in their penultimate game of the 1997–98 season against Wimbledon, which ended 6–2.

International career
He played as a midfielder and was captain of the Algerian national team in the early 1990s. the team won the 1990 African Nations Cup.

Coaching career
On 18 August 2007, Saïb was appointed manager of Algerian team JS Kabylie. In June 2008, after steering the team to the Algerian league title, Saïb left to take charge of Saudi Arabian team Al-Watani.

On 27 June 2011, he was appointed as manager of JS Kabylie for the second time. On 1 September 2011, JS Kabylie president Mohand Chérif Hannachi announced that Saïb was relieved from his duties as manager of the club.

Honours

As player
JS Kabylie
 African Champions League: 1990
 Algerian League: 1990, 2004
Algerian Cup: 1992
Algerian Super Cup: 1992

Auxerre
 French League: 1996
 French Cup: 1994, 1996

Lorient
 French Cup: 2002

Tottenham Hotspur
 League Cup: 1999

Al Nassr
 FIFA Club World Championship participation: 2000

International
 African Cup of Nations: 1990
 Afro-Asian Cup of Nations: 1991

Individual
 DZFoot d'Or: 2003
 Algerian Ballon d'Or: 2004

As coach
JS Kabylie
 Algerian League: 2008

References

External links
Article on Saib in Mehstg magazine

1969 births
Living people
Kabyle people
Association football midfielders
Algerian footballers
Algeria international footballers
Algerian expatriate footballers
Premier League players
La Liga players
Ligue 1 players
AJ Auxerre players
Valencia CF players
Tottenham Hotspur F.C. players
AS Monaco FC players
FC Lorient players
Al Nassr FC players
Dubai CSC players
JS Kabylie players
1990 African Cup of Nations players
1992 African Cup of Nations players
1996 African Cup of Nations players
1998 African Cup of Nations players
Algerian expatriate sportspeople in the United Arab Emirates
Algerian expatriate sportspeople in Spain
Algerian expatriate sportspeople in France
Algerian expatriate sportspeople in England
Algerian expatriate sportspeople in Monaco
2000 African Cup of Nations players
Expatriate footballers in England
Expatriate footballers in Spain
Expatriate footballers in France
Expatriate footballers in Monaco
Expatriate footballers in Saudi Arabia
Expatriate footballers in the United Arab Emirates
Algerian football managers
JS Kabylie managers
Algerian expatriate sportspeople in Saudi Arabia
People from Tissemsilt Province
ASO Chlef managers
JSM Tiaret players
Africa Cup of Nations-winning players
Saudi Professional League players
UAE Pro League players
21st-century Algerian people
Expatriate football managers in Saudi Arabia
Saudi Professional League managers